Tenellia pallida is a species of sea slug, an aeolid nudibranch, a marine gastropod mollusc in the family Fionidae.

Taxonomic history
The species was first described, then named as Amphorina pallida by Charles Eliot. Later it became poorly understood, then rarely known. It was rediscovered and redescribed in 2002 and placed it in the genus Cuthona. Recently, a DNA phylogeny of the former family Tergipedidae resulted in most species of Cuthona being transferred to the genus Tenellia, including Cuthona pallida which became Tenellia pallida.

Distribution
This species was described from the Cape Verde Islands.

References 

Fionidae
Gastropods described in 1906
Gastropods of Cape Verde